Taj Jami Gibson (born June 24, 1985) is an American professional basketball player for the Washington Wizards of the National Basketball Association (NBA). Gibson played college basketball for the USC Trojans and was selected 26th overall by the Chicago Bulls in the 2009 NBA draft. The power forward played mostly a sixth man role off the bench for the Bulls before being traded to the Oklahoma City Thunder in 2017, later signing with the Minnesota Timberwolves the same year. In 2019, he signed with the Knicks.

Early life and high school career
Gibson was born on June 24, 1985, in Brooklyn, New York. He attended P.S. 67 Charles A. Dorsey School in Brooklyn's Fort Greene neighborhood. Gibson began his high school career at Brooklyn's High School of Telecommunication Arts and Technology. He then attended Stoneridge Prep as a sophomore and junior in Tarzana, California. During his senior year in 2006, he attended Calvary Christian in San Fernando, California.

College career

Gibson played at the University of Southern California, where he was a member of the Phi Kappa Psi fraternity. As one of the oldest freshmen in the country at age 21 in 2007 he was named to the Pac-10 All-Freshman team. He helped beat rival UCLA in 2008. Gibson was named to the 2009 All-Pac 10 Tournament Team by helping the Trojans win the Pacific-10 tournament championship at the Staples Center.

Professional career

Chicago Bulls (2009–2017)
Gibson declared for the 2009 NBA draft, and was selected 26th overall by the Chicago Bulls. Along with fellow draft pick James Johnson, he signed with the Bulls in July 2009. Gibson was the starting power forward for most of his rookie season with the Bulls and impressed many people with his high energy and good defense. During the All-Star Weekend, Gibson played in the Rookie Challenge, where the Rookie team won for the first time since 2002. The Bulls made the playoffs, securing the 8th seed in the Eastern Conference. Gibson averaged 7.6 points per game and 7.0 rebounds while the Bulls lost to the Cleveland Cavaliers in the first round. At the end of his first season, he was selected to the NBA All-Rookie First Team.

During the 2010 off-season, the Bulls signed power forward Carlos Boozer, who was expected to start at the beginning of the season rather than Gibson. But Boozer broke his hand before the pre-season, and Gibson started the first 15 games of the season. After Boozer's return, Gibson moved into a bench role for most of the season. He was selected as a starter for the Sophomore squad in the 2011 NBA Rising Stars challenge at the All-Star weekend, which the Rookie team won 148–140. Gibson played 18 minutes and recorded 8 points. At the end of the season, the Bulls made the playoffs as the first seed in the Eastern Conference. On May 10, 2011, Gibson helped his team take a 3–2 lead in the Eastern Conference semifinals against Atlanta, making all of his 11 points in the fourth quarter.

In May 2012, Gibson was named to the US Select Team, joining Jeremy Lin, DeMarcus Cousins, and Kyrie Irving in practicing with the US Olympic Team in preparation for the 2012 Summer Olympics in London. On October 31, 2012, Gibson signed a multi-year rookie scale contract extension with the Bulls. Playing mostly a bench role in 2013–14, Gibson averaged 13 points and 6.8 rebounds on the season and was among the league leaders in blocked shots per game. He finished second in the NBA's Sixth Man of the Year Award, losing to Jamal Crawford. On June 16, 2015, Gibson underwent arthroscopic surgery on his left ankle and was ruled out for four months. During the 2015–16 season, he appeared in 73 games and averaged 8.6 points and 6.9 rebounds.

Oklahoma City Thunder (2017)
On February 23, 2017, Gibson was traded, along with Doug McDermott and an unprotected 2018 second-round draft pick, to the Oklahoma City Thunder in exchange for Joffrey Lauvergne, Anthony Morrow, and Cameron Payne.

Minnesota Timberwolves (2017–2019)

On July 10, 2017, Gibson signed with the Minnesota Timberwolves, reuniting himself with coach Tom Thibodeau. He became the second NBA player ever to wear No. 67, in honor of his Brooklyn elementary school, P.S. 67. On November 22, 2017, he scored a season-high 24 points in a 124–118 win over the Orlando Magic. On February 15, 2018, Gibson scored a season-high 28 points against the Los Angeles Lakers.

New York Knicks (2019–2022)
On July 9, 2019, Gibson signed with his hometown team the New York Knicks. On November 19, 2020, the Knicks waived Gibson. On January 7, 2021, Gibson re-signed with the Knicks.
He was waived again on July 8, 2022.

Washington Wizards (2022–present)
On July 19, 2022, Gibson signed with the Washington Wizards.

Career statistics

NBA

Regular season

|-
| style="text-align:left;"|
| style="text-align:left;"|Chicago
| 82 || 70 || 26.9 || .494 ||  || .646 || 7.5 || .9 || .6 || 1.3 || 9.0
|-
| style="text-align:left;"|
| style="text-align:left;"|Chicago
| 80 || 19 || 21.8 || .466 || .125 || .676 || 5.7 || .7 || .7|| 1.3 || 7.1
|-
| style="text-align:left;"|
| style="text-align:left;"|Chicago
| 63 || 0 || 20.4 || .495 ||  || .622 || 5.3 || .7 || .4 || 1.3 || 7.7
|-
| style="text-align:left;"|
| style="text-align:left;"|Chicago
| 65 || 5 || 22.4 || .485 || .000 || .679 || 5.3 || .9 || .4 || 1.4 || 8.0
|-
| style="text-align:left;"|
| style="text-align:left;"|Chicago
| 82 || 8 || 28.7 || .479 || .000 || .751 || 6.8 || 1.1 || .5 || 1.4 || 13.0
|-
| style="text-align:left;"|
| style="text-align:left;"|Chicago
| 62 || 17 || 27.3 || .502 ||  || .717 || 6.4 || 1.1 || .6 || 1.2 || 10.3
|-
| style="text-align:left;"|
| style="text-align:left;"|Chicago
| 73 || 55 || 26.5 || .526 || .000 || .692 || 6.9 || 1.5 || .6 || 1.1 || 8.6
|-
| style="text-align:left;"|
| style="text-align:left;"|Chicago
| 56 || 55 || 27.2 || .523 || .167 || .714 || 6.9 || 1.1 || .5 || .9 || 11.6
|-
| style="text-align:left;"|
| style="text-align:left;"|Oklahoma City
| 23 || 16 || 21.2 || .497 || 1.000 || .718 || 4.5 || .6 || .6 || .7 || 9.0
|-
| style="text-align:left;"|
| style="text-align:left;"|Minnesota
| 82 || 82 || 33.2 || .577 || .200 || .768 || 7.1 || 1.2 || .8 || .7 || 12.2
|-
| style="text-align:left;"|
| style="text-align:left;"|Minnesota
| 70 || 57 || 24.1 || .566 || .324 || .757 || 6.5 || 1.2 || .8 || .6 || 10.8
|-
| style="text-align:left;"|
| style="text-align:left;"|New York
| 62 || 56 || 16.5 || .584 || .286 || .732 || 4.3 || .8 || .4 || .5 || 6.1
|-
| style="text-align:left;"|
| style="text-align:left;"|New York
| 45 || 3 || 20.8 || .627 || .200 || .727 || 5.6 || .8 || .7 || 1.1 || 5.4
|-
| style="text-align:left;"|
| style="text-align:left;"|New York
| 52 || 4 || 18.2 || .518 || .395 || .808 || 4.4 || .6 || .4 || .8 || 4.4
|- class="sortbottom"
| style="text-align:center;" colspan="2"|Career
| 896 || 447 || 24.5 || .518 || .257 || .713 || 6.1 || 1.0 || .6 || 1.0 || 9.0

Playoffs

|-
| style="text-align:left;"|2010
| style="text-align:left;"|Chicago
| 5 || 5 || 29.0 || .421 ||  || .545 || 7.0 || .6 || .2 || .6 || 7.6
|-
| style="text-align:left;"|2011
| style="text-align:left;"|Chicago
| 16 || 0 || 17.8 || .566 || .000 || .600 || 4.1 || .6 || .3 || 1.4 || 5.9
|-
| style="text-align:left;"|2012
| style="text-align:left;"|Chicago
| 6 || 0 || 22.8 || .457 ||  || .682 || 6.5 || .7 || .7 || 1.7 || 9.5
|-
| style="text-align:left;"|2013
| style="text-align:left;"|Chicago
| 12 || 0 || 17.2 || .470 || .000 || .727 || 3.0 || .3 || .3 || .5 || 6.5
|-
| style="text-align:left;"|2014
| style="text-align:left;"|Chicago
| 5 || 0 || 30.8 || .561 ||  || .750 || 6.2 || .4 || .4 || 2.4 || 18.2
|-
| style="text-align:left;"|2015
| style="text-align:left;"|Chicago
| 12 || 2 || 23.0 || .472 ||  || .700 || 5.5 || 1.0 || .3 || 1.0 || 7.4
|-
| style="text-align:left;"|2017
| style="text-align:left;"|Oklahoma City
| 5 || 5 || 23.6 || .600 ||  || .875 || 3.6 || .6 || .2 || .0 || 9.8
|-
| style="text-align:left;"|2018
| style="text-align:left;"|Minnesota
| 5 || 5 || 24.6 || .636 ||  || 1.000 || 4.0 || .4 || .2 || .4 || 6.2
|-
| style="text-align:left;"|2021
| style="text-align:left;"|New York
| 5 || 3 || 27.6 || .600 || — || 1.000 || 7.0 || .8 || 1.6 || 1.0 || 5.0
|- class="sortbottom"
| style="text-align:center;" colspan="2"|Career
| 71 || 20 || 22.3 || .519 || .000 || .709 || 4.9 || .6 || .4 || 1.0 || 7.8

College

|-
| style="text-align:left;"|2006–07
| style="text-align:left;"|USC
| 37 || 37 || 32.4 || .558 ||  || .623 || 8.7 || 1.5 || .5 || 1.9 || 12.2
|-
| style="text-align:left;"|2007–08
| style="text-align:left;"|USC
| 33 || 32 || 32.1 || .580 ||  || .594 || 7.8 || 1.3 || .7 || 2.5 || 10.8
|-
| style="text-align:left;"|2008–09
| style="text-align:left;"|USC
| 35 || 35 || 33.7 || .601 ||  || .659 || 9.0 || 1.3 || 1.0 || 2.9 || 14.3
|- class="sortbottom"
| style="text-align:center;" colspan="2"|Career
| 105 || 104 || 32.7 || .580 ||  || .629 || 8.5 || 1.4 || .7 || 2.4 || 12.4

See also

References

External links

 USC Trojans bio

1985 births
Living people
20th-century African-American sportspeople
21st-century African-American sportspeople
African-American basketball players
American men's basketball players
Basketball players from New York City
Chicago Bulls draft picks
Chicago Bulls players
Minnesota Timberwolves players
New York Knicks players
Oklahoma City Thunder players
Power forwards (basketball)
Sportspeople from Brooklyn
USC Trojans men's basketball players
Washington Wizards players